Buddy Jones may refer to:
 Buddy Jones (Western swing musician) (1902–1956)
 Buddy Jones (bluegrass musician) (1937–2014)
 Buddy Jones (American football) from List of Oklahoma Sooners football All-Americans